Columbine II is a Lockheed VC-121A-LO Constellation (Air Force Serial Number 48–0610, Lockheed Model 749-79-36); the aircraft that was to become the first plane to use the Air Force One callsign and the only presidential aircraft ever sold to a private party.  The aircraft was ferried from long-term storage in the Sonoran Desert at Marana Regional Airport, Arizona, to the east coast for restoration in March 2016.

Presidential aircraft
Columbine II was built as a C-121A at Burbank, California and bailed to Lockheed to support the Lockheed Air Service International maintenance facility at Keflavík, Iceland. In November 1952, President-elect Dwight D. Eisenhower used the aircraft to travel to South Korea. Early in 1953 this aircraft was converted to VC-121A-LO standard for use by President Eisenhower, until replaced by VC-121E-LO Columbine III (AF Ser. No. 53-7885), operated by the 1254th Air Transport Squadron of the United States Air Force (USAF).

Preservation

After being replaced, Columbine II continued in service with the United States Air Force until retired to Davis–Monthan Air Force Base for storage during the late 1960s. The aircraft was sold as part of a package lot to Mel Christler, a Wyoming businessman who owned a crop-dusting service, and was made airworthy in 1989 and flown to Abilene, Kansas for Eisenhower's 100th birthday celebration and to an air show at Andrews Air Force Base, Maryland.  In 2003, it was flown to Marana Regional Airport, Arizona.

The aircraft owner was considering cutting the aircraft up as scrap when the Smithsonian Institution, during a research project, contacted the owner and informed him that 48-0610 was, in fact, a former presidential aircraft. The owner then, in the hope of finding a new owner willing to display the aircraft, attempted to sell the plane at auction, but it was not sold.

Columbine II was purchased and moved from Arizona to Bridgewater, Virginia in March 2016 for restoration by Dynamic Aviation.  The purchase price has not been disclosed, but the purchaser, Karl D. Stoltzfus Sr., founder of Dynamic Aviation, has said it was less than $1.5 million.  Dynamic Aviation mechanics did significant work on the plane in Arizona in preparation for its flight to Virginia. The restoration is expected to take several years to complete.

Call-sign "Air Force One"
Columbine II was the first plane to bear the call sign Air Force One. This designation for the U.S. Air Force aircraft carrying the incumbent president was established after an incident in 1953, when Eastern Air Lines 8610, a commercial flight, crossed paths with Air Force 8610, which was carrying President Eisenhower.

References

External links

 Video - America's lost Air Force One, YouTube.com
 First Air Force One, dynamicaviation.com

1940s United States military transport aircraft
Individual aircraft
 
Presidential aircraft
Vehicles of the United States